2016 J.League Cup Final was the 24th final of the J.League Cup competition. The final was played at Saitama Stadium 2002 in Saitama on October 15, 2016. Urawa Reds won the championship.

Match details

See also
2016 J.League Cup

References

J.League Cup
2016 in Japanese football
Urawa Red Diamonds matches
Gamba Osaka matches
J.League Cup Final 2016